Nhi Lan Le (born May 30, 1964) is an American fencer. She competed in the women's individual and team épée events at the 1996 Summer Olympics.

References

External links
 

1964 births
Living people
American female épée fencers
Olympic fencers of the United States
Fencers at the 1996 Summer Olympics
Vietnamese emigrants to the United States
Pan American Games medalists in fencing
Pan American Games bronze medalists for the United States
Fencers at the 1999 Pan American Games
21st-century American women